Alyaksey Paznyak (born 16 April 1981) is a retired Belarusian professional football player.

External links
 
 
 Profile at teams.by

1981 births
Living people
Sportspeople from Vitebsk
Belarusian footballers
Association football defenders
FC Lokomotiv Vitebsk (defunct) players
FC Vitebsk players
FC Molodechno players
FC Partizan Minsk players
FC Torpedo-BelAZ Zhodino players
FC Slavia Mozyr players
FC Khimik Svetlogorsk players